Bury Me Behind the Baseboard is a 2009 Russian psychological drama film directed by Sergey Snezhkin.

Cast 
 Aleksandr 'Sasha' Drobitko - Grandson
 Svetlana Kryuchkova - Grandma
 Aleksei Petrenko - Granddad
 Maria Shukshina - Mum
 Konstantin Vorobyov - Tolik
 Valery Kukhareshin - Aaron Moiseevich, homeopath

References

External links 

2009 films
2000s psychological drama films
Russian drama films
Films about dysfunctional families
2009 drama films